Aganang Local Municipality, was a municipality in the Capricorn District Municipality, of Limpopo province, South Africa. Aganang is a Northern Sotho name that means "uplifting one another". It was de-established after the 2016 local government elections and incorporated into neighboring municipalities.

Main places
The 2011 census divided the municipality into the following main places:

Politics 
The municipal council consists of thirty-seven members elected by mixed-member proportional representation. Nineteen councillors are elected by first-past-the-post voting in nineteen wards, while the remaining eighteen are chosen from party lists so that the total number of party representatives is proportional to the number of votes received. In the election of 18 May 2011 the African National Congress (ANC) won a majority of thirty-two seats on the council.
The following table shows the results of the election.

References

External links
 Official Website

Local municipalities of the Capricorn District Municipality